Squeeze Me is a novel by Carl Hiaasen released on August 25, 2020.

Hiaasen dedicated the novel to his younger brother, Rob, who was killed during the Capital Gazette shooting on June 28, 2018. The book debuted at #2 on the New York Times Best Seller list.

The trade paperback edition of Squeeze Me was released on May 11, 2021, featuring a brand-new epilogue written in the aftermath of the 2020 United States presidential election. Hiaasen explained, "It seemed clear to me that the bizarre and menacing real-life events following the recent national election required some satirical attention – an updated coda for the characters in the book, as well as for the readers."

About 
The mysterious disappearance of a wealthy, elderly socialite from the grounds of a Palm Beach mansion during a charity gala sets off a manhunt by the local police, egged on by the victim's wealthy friends, all members of a social club devoted to supporting the current President of the United States. When the caretaker finds the socialites body, he unsuccessfully attempts to cover-up the freakish true circumstances of the woman's death. Meanwhile, a local wildlife trapper is called to trap and remove numerous invasive Burmese pythons being discovered all over Palm Beach. Working with a retired highway patrol officer and a "legendary" former Florida politician, the snake menace is finally ended.

Synopsis

Part One: Get A Grip 
On January 23, Katherine ”Kiki" Sparling Pew Fitzsimmons (72) wanders onto the grounds of the exclusive Lipid Estate in Palm Beach after dinner during the annual "White Ibis Ball" to benefit victims of IBS.  When she fails to return, a search of the grounds finds only her purse, an empty martini glass, and a rose-colored tablet of Ecstasy, bitten in half, littered next to the koi pond.  Fitzsimmons's best friend, Fay Alex Riptoad, demands that Palm Beach Chief of Police Jerry Crosby devote his department's entire resources to finding her.  Crosby has little choice but to comply, knowing   that Fitzsimmons, Riptoad, and five other widowed Palm Beach socialites co-founded the "POTUS Pussies" (shortened to "Potussies" for media purposes); besides their considerable combined wealth, the women are all fiercely loyal supporters of the President of the United States, and frequent guests at his nearby "Winter White House", Casa Bellicosa.

The following night, Lipid Estate's manager, Tripp Teabull, anxiously summons wildlife control expert Angela "Angie" Armstrong to deal with an 18-foot Burmese python that appeared on the grounds during the annual "Stars And SARS Ball."  Since the snake (identified by her size as a female) cannot be removed from the tree she is occupying without drawing attention unless she is dead, Teabull reluctantly permits Angie to decapitate her with a machete.  After Angie has removed the snake's corpse, Teabull belatedly makes the connection between Fitzsimmons's disappearance and the bulge in the python's stomach.  Terrified of the negative publicity if the truth comes out, Teabull hires two amateur burglars to break into Angie's apartment, and then her rented storage freezer, stealing the snake's corpse before Angie can turn it over to the state wildlife authorities for dissection.

To Teabull's horror, the clueless burglars drive the corpse back to Lipid Estate to ask what should be done with it.  He hurriedly tells them to bury it in the foundation of a nearby construction site.  When the burglars open their trunk, they are unnerved to see the snake's corpse has split, revealing Fitzsimmons's half-digested remains inside.  Their nerve only lasts long enough for them to bury Fitzsimmons, before speeding away from the scene, inadvertently jettisoning the snake's headless body onto the highway along with a few loose pieces of Fitzsimmons's jewelry.  The next morning, the snake's corpse briefly delays the First Lady's motorcade on its way to Casa Bellicosa, before it is removed by the Secret Service.  Paul Ryskamp, the head of the Service's West Palm Beach office, calls Angie to remove the corpse and offer her opinion on whether or not other snakes might present a danger to the President (code-named "Mastodon") or his wife (code-named "Mockingbird").

Diego Beltrán, a refugee from political violence in Honduras, arrives illegally in South Florida on the same night as the Ibis Ball.  Crossing a railway intersection on his way to work, he notices and picks up a Conch Pearl from the tracks, not knowing it came from a necklace worn by Fitzsimmons.  During a routine sweep by ICE, he is picked up and the jewel is found in his belongings.

Under pressure from Riptoad, Crosby shares what little progress their investigation has made, including that Beltrán is being held "on suspicion."  Riptoad, who like all the Potussies shares the President's rabid xenophobia, ignores Crosby’s warnings that the evidence against Beltrán is tenuous and immediately shares it with the Oval Office.

Fitzsimmons's family reluctantly posts a $100,000 reward for information leading to her whereabouts.  Seeing the posting, one of the burglars, Uric Burns, strangles his partner to death and calls in an anonymous tip, which leads the Palm Beach police to find Fitzsimmons's body at the construction site.  Seeing the same posting, Angie quickly realizes what really happened to Fitzsimmons, and she shares it with Crosby, who sets a trap for Burns at the bank where he is supposed to collect the reward money.  Before Burns arrives, however, he is abducted and killed by Teabull, desperate to cover his tracks.

Angie, Ryskamp, and Crosby are horrified by what happens next: at an impromptu press conference from a Maryland golf course, the President denounces Beltrán as the head of a "horde" of immigrants "invading" the country to assassinate the President’s most loyal supporters, and declares a "crusade" on social media with the slogan "NO MORE DIEGOS!"

Part Two: Muscle of Love 
Crosby and Ryscamp interview Beltrán and find evidence corroborating his innocence, including a second Conch Pearl found on the same railroad tracks where Beltrán found the first, and camera footage of the burglars' stolen Chevrolet Malibu at the Lipid Estate on the day after Fitzsimmons's disappearance, and the fact that both the burglars were killed after Beltrán was already in custody.  But Angie is furious when Crosby and Ryskamp agree that there is no way of getting Beltrán a fair trial, or of releasing him from jail, as long as the President is demonizing him on the Internet.  They both reassure her that it will not be long before the President becomes distracted by some other notion and abandons the "crusade."

But days turn into weeks, and then months, as the President's campaign continues (egged on by the Potussies, who are thrilled to be assigned Secret Service bodyguards as a show of how seriously the President takes the "threat" to their safety).  "No More Diegos!" protesters surround the jail, and Beltrán survives several murder attempts inside, gradually losing hope as even his own defense lawyers are forced to withdraw after receiving multiple death threats.  Although Teabull has eliminated all of the evidence against himself, he is still fired by his employers due to the bad publicity over Kiki Pew's death and forced to take a caretaker job in Newfoundland.

Meanwhile, more giant Burmese pythons appear in Palm Beach, including one slipped into the bakery truck carrying the President's personal shipment of Key Lime Pies from Marathon to Casa Bellicosa, and another into a bikini shop recently visited by the First Lady. Angie is called to consult several more times, and she and Ryskamp eventually begin dating and become lovers.  She tells both him and Crosby that what they are seeing is not a random migration; someone is capturing or breeding pythons and releasing the largest ones in Palm Beach.  Concerned that someone may be deliberately targeting the First Family, Ryskamp advises that they return to Washington, D.C., but they both refuse.  Ryskamp privately confirms that both are carrying on extra-marital affairs in Florida: Mastodon with a local stripper masquerading as his nutritionist; Mockingbird with Keith Josephson a.k.a. Ahmet Youssef, the Secret Service agent heading her protection detail.

Angie used to be employed by the state as a wildlife officer, until she saw a poacher killing a fawn and not only arrested him, but deliberately fed his hand to an alligator, for which offense she lost her job and served fourteen months at Gadsden Correctional Facility.  She is surprised to be contacted by retired Florida Highway Patrol trooper Jim Tile, through whom she learns the name of the anonymous benefactor who paid for her defense lawyer: former state governor Clinton "Skink" Tyree, now living as a wild hermit and eco-terrorist in the Crocodile Lake National Wildlife Refuge.  Tile says she needs to see for herself what Skink's latest "project" is.  When she visits Skink's camp, she finds he is the python "unleasher."  She warns Ryscamp and Crosby, but when she returns to Skink's camp the next day, both he and the pythons are gone.

In the spring, Ryskamp hires Angie to patrol the grounds of Casa Bellicosa during the annual "Commander's Ball", a pro-POTUS fundraiser lovingly organized by the Potussies.  Due to a malfunctioning tanning bed, the President suffers disfiguring burns to his face, but refuses either to go to the hospital or skip the event, choosing to appear on stage covering his face with an African tribal mask.  He delivers yet another impassioned "No More Diegos!" speech to the audience.  Beltrán, seeing the speech on television, attempts suicide with an overdose of sleeping pills given to him by the prison doctor after one of the attempts on his life.

The Ball is disrupted when Skink's largest python (measuring just under 24 feet/7.32 meters) appears on the grounds, interrupting a drunken tryst between Fay Alex Riptoad and the intoxicated brother of one of the other Potussies.  The President, annoyed at the diversion of the crowd's attention, storms outside to see what is going on, and is genuinely dumbstruck at the sight of the python, before his Secret Service bodyguards hustle him back inside.  Angie is forced to dispatch the python (again by decapitation, since there are too many guests present for her to risk using a firearm).  The resulting gore does not faze her, but ruins the expensive Versace dress that Ryskamp insisted she wear to fit in with the Ball's attendees.

Having learned about the First Family's respective affairs through Ryskamp and a friend on Casa Bellicosa's service staff, Angie has a note slipped to the First Lady, summoning her to a private blackmail meeting on the grounds.  Angered by the news of Beltrán's suicide attempt, Angie lays out three simple demands: in exchange for Angie remaining silent about the First Lady's affair with Youssef, Mockingbird will persuade the President to have the Justice Department release Beltrán from jail, to have INS approve his application for political asylum, and to have Homeland Security issue a public statement exonerating him of Fitzsimmons's death.  Angie guesses (correctly) that Mockingbird cares enough about Youssef that she does not wish to see his life and career ruined by their affair being exposed.

Mockingbird confronts Mastodon in private.  At first the President is defiant, arguing that even if Beltrán is innocent of murder, he is still an illegal immigrant who deserves to be "locked up", and besides, Mastodon's "No More Diegos!" crusade is "on fire" on the Internet.  Mockingbird - galvanized by her own anger at her husband's casual philandering with the stripper - threatens to divorce him and expose every one of his dirty secrets on TMZ.  She acknowledges that the resulting court battle and public scandal would be messy for both of them, but they both know he has far more to lose than she does.

Outside, Angie sees Jim Tile in attendance at the Ball as one of the guests, with Skink making a brief appearance as his chauffeur.  Skink released giant pythons at gala events all over Palm Beach on the same night, but was unable to resist seeing the results of his handiwork with his own eyes.

Epilogue: Uncoiled 
Beltrán survives his suicide attempt, and is not only released from jail, but exonerated by a statement on the Homeland Security website, and immediately granted political asylum.  He is slipped out of the Palm Beach jail in disguise and flies to Union City, where he has been offered a job with the U.S. Census Bureau.

Jerry Crosby acted swiftly to euthanize the pythons at the other galas before anyone was killed, but the Palm Beach City Council is furious over the outbreak nonetheless.  Crosby resigns as Chief of Police before the Council can vote to fire him.  Not regretting the loss of his job in the least, he applies for other law enforcement positions in Florida, while presenting the second Conch Pearl on a necklace to his wife.

The President abandons his "No More Diegos!" crusade in favor of a new crusade, centered around a purported Chinese intelligence agent crossing the Mexican border after intentionally infecting himself with a virulent disease.  Mockingbird, enjoying a getaway at a private beach with Youssef, is amused to receive a letter from one of Mastodon's lawyers, confirming that his mistress agreed to accept approximately $300,000 paid from Casa Bellicosa's catering budget, in exchange for scrapping her forthcoming book about their affair.

Ryscamp retires from the Secret Service.  On her way to his home in Key West for a romantic weekend, Angie makes a detour to Skink's new camp in the Everglades.  He confirms that all the pythons he was breeding were released, and subsequently killed, but reminds her that they are an invasive species.  In frustration, Angie asks what the point of the whole "campaign" was supposed to be, since they both know that there is no Burmese python large enough to swallow a man of the President's girth.  Skink says assassination was never his goal, he just wanted to show POTUS and the rest of the wealthy, secluded Palm Beach "set" something they had never considered.  Angie angrily says that he is indirectly responsible for Kiki Fitzsimmons's death, but she is stunned when he reveals that the python that devoured Fitzsimmons was not one of his.  That python's migration to Palm Beach and her appearance at the Lipid Estate was a completely random act of nature - in fact, it was what inspired Skink's "campaign" in the first place.

Epilogue (II): Exiled 
N.B. This epilogue was added to the paperback edition, published on May 11, 2021.

After his expulsion from Washington, D.C., Mastodon returns to Casa Bellicosa, where membership and the number of staff employed have both declined sharply.  Likewise, event revenue at the club has declined after the ex-President's private helipad was demolished and noisy traffic from Palm Beach International Airport has been allowed to resume flying overhead.

Youssef breaks off his affair with Mockingbird and transfers off her security detail after she refuses to divorce her husband, explaining that their "companionship contract" which compensates her for appearing in public with Mastodon does not expire for another three years and is too lucrative for her to consider terminating early.  But alone in the club's pool, she glimpses her husband on a balcony in an open bathrobe and privately reflects that she isn't getting paid nearly enough.

The Potussies, chagrined at having contributed nearly half a million dollars to Mastodon's various election lawsuits without the barest acknowledgment from him, and being blacklisted from events all over the island after the Capitol riots, are considering disbanding their group and applying for memberships at different country clubs, though they are reluctant to believe that Mastodon's political career is permanently over.

Since the calamitous night of the Commander's Ball, Angie has been retained by at least twenty Palm Beach clubs, including Casa Bellicosa, to patrol their grounds weekly for more pythons.  Few are ever spotted, making the work both easy and very profitable for her.  Catching sight of her on the grounds, Mastodon has her brought to a secluded pavilion and propositions her.  Angie politely responds, "I'd rather put my head in a wood chipper", and informs him that her weekly fee has just tripled.

Leaving the pavilion, Angie sees another python swimming in the ocean beyond the club's seawall, marveling at the sight, before going home to pack for another weekend with Ryskamp in Key West.

Characters 
Angela "Angie" Armstrong wildlife wrangler
Joel Angie's stepson;
Pruitt Angie's stalker, a vengeful semi-retired poacher;
Jerry Crosby Palm Beach Chief of Police;
Paul Ryskamp Secret Service agent, head of the West Palm Beach field office;
Ahmet Youssef a.k.a. Keith Josephson Secret Service agent, head of the First Lady's protection detail;
Diego Beltrán political refugee from Honduras;
Spaulding server at Casa Bellicosa;
Christian mechanic servicing the Presidential tanning bed at Casa Bellicosa;
"The Knob" the tanning bed's "test dummy"
"Mockingbird" First Lady of the United States
"Mastodon" President of the United States
Clinton "Skink" Tyree former governor of Florida
Jim Tile Retired Florida Highway Patrol, Tyree's best friend
Uric Burns burglar for hire
Keever Bracco, a.k.a. "Prince Paladin" Uric's partner
The (surviving) POTUS Pussies Fay Alex RiptoadDee Wyndham WittlefieldKelly Bean DrummondDorothea Mars BristolDeirdre Cobo LancomeYirma Skyy Frick

Literary references 
Skink's counterfeit driver license bears a photograph of musician Jackson Browne and the name "George W. Hayduke, Jr.", a tribute to a primary character from Edward Abbey's The Monkey Wrench Gang;
Before departing on the final phase of his "campaign", Skink leaves behind a copy of Franz Kafka's The Zürau Aphorisms, with a relevant passage underlined.

Audiobook 
The audiobook version of Squeeze Me was released concurrently with the hardcover novel in August, 2020, on compact disc and MP3, narrated by Scott Brick.  The version won an Earphone Award from AudioFile magazine, the review for which stated, "Brick offers an array of unique voices for the interesting characters who navigate the ensuing intrigue and inept politicking. He excels at developing irresistible salt-of-the-earth personalities like Angie's while also lampooning the 45th president and his affluent Florida cronies."  It was also a finalist for an Audie Award in the same year.

Critical reception 
Janet Maslin, who had released an overwhelmingly favorable review of Hiaasen's previous novel, Razor Girl, likewise praised Squeeze Me in her review for the New York Times: "If you are wearing a MAGA anything, you won't like this book... But if you could use some wild escapism right now, Hiaasen is your guy. In its themes and its wild imagination, Squeeze Me offers some familiar pleasures, akin to a Greatest Hits collection."

Richard Lipez echoed this praise in the Washington Post: "by the evidence of the scabrous and unrelentingly hilarious Squeeze Me, the Trump era is truly Carl Hiaasen's moment... One unnerving aspect of 'Squeeze Me' is that it’s set in post-pandemic Palm Beach and Trump is still president. It will be useful for any pro-Biden readers to view this not as pessimism on Hiaasen's part but simply as some additional deeply mordant humor. Just dive in and have a wonderful time.... Hiaasen’s narrative wanders around a bit randomly, but with all the lovingly biting detail there isn't a page here that flags."

Alex Shephard, reviewing Squeeze Me for The New Republic, compared the novel favorably with other, "embarrassing" satires of the Trump Administration, including Salman Rushdie's The Golden House, Howard Jacobson's Pussy  and Dave Eggers's The Captain and the Glory:
Novelists, like the rest of us, can't look away from the Trump administration. Unfortunately, they haven’t found much interesting to say about it.... Squeeze Me is, blessedly, an exception. While the best Trump fiction has dialed up the absurdity to speculative extremes, Hiaasen is clear-eyed: He meets the president on his subterranean level.

Trump is, in many ways, the perfect Hiaasen character: a rich, vain, racist, twice-divorced Palm Beach resident with a penchant for affairs with porn stars. Alec Baldwin's impression of Trump as a two-bit outer-borough thug has never sat right with me. Reading Squeeze Me, I finally understood why: Donald Trump is a Florida Man, through and through.

By setting Squeeze Me in Palm Beach, Hiaasen focuses squarely on the president’s wealthiest supporters - the true heart of his base. There’s a tendency to treat Trump mania as a distinctly low-class affair, but for Hiaasen it’s an outgrowth of an out-of-touch gerontocracy. The wealthy of Palm Beach are money-grubbing and amoral.... These people support Trump because they have nothing but disdain for everyone beneath them - it's a way of acting out fantasies of punishing the poor and the non-white.

Squeeze Me is funny, but as with Hiaasen's best work, it’s grounded in genuine outrage over the corruption that increasingly defines American political and cultural life.

See also 
Donald Trump in popular culture
Burmese pythons in Florida

References

2020 American novels
Cultural depictions of Donald Trump
Cultural depictions of Melania Trump
Novels by Carl Hiaasen
Novels set in Florida
21st-century American women
Alfred A. Knopf books